Bushey Studios was a British film studio located in Melbourne Road, Bushey, Hertfordshire which operated between 1913 and 1985. The studios were built by the film enthusiast Hubert von Herkomer in the grounds of his country house, Lululaund. They gradually took on a more professional air and in 1915 they were acquired by the British Actors Film Company for use as their principal production base. After the company ran into problems, the studio was closed during much of the 1920s. During the 1930s film boom, it was re-opened and used to produce a number of quota quickies.

After the Second World War, the studios were used intermittently - generally to produce low-budget films such as the Tod Slaughter vehicle The Greed of William Hart (1948). It went on to produce documentaries and sex comedies before its closure. At the time of its closure, it was the oldest operational film studio in the world.

References

Bibliography
 Warren, Patricia. British Film Studios: An Illustrated History. Batsford, 2001.

British film studios
Buildings and structures in Hertfordshire
Film production companies of the United Kingdom
1913 establishments in England
1985 disestablishments in England
British companies disestablished in 1985
British companies established in 1913